Macaroni Boy is a children's historical novel by the American writer Katherine Ayres.

It is set in 1933 in Pittsburgh, Pennsylvania during the Great Depression and tells the story of sixth-grader Mike Costa. His large Italian-American family owns a food warehouse in the Strip District, but the school bully taunts him, calling him Macaroni Boy. Mike is the store's rat killer, and when he checks his traps he is catching fewer. Mike eventually discovers a connection between the dying rats and his grandfather's illness. Mike's best friend, Joseph, helps Mike solve this great mystery

References

2004 American novels
2004 children's books
American children's novels
Children's historical novels
Fiction set in 1933
Great Depression novels
Italian-American novels
Novels set in Pittsburgh